Bargoens  is a form of Dutch slang. More specifically, it is a cant language that arose in the 17th century, and was used by criminals, tramps and travelling salesmen as a secret code, like Spain's Germanía or French Argot. It is speculated to originate from Rotwelsch

However, the word Bargoens usually refers to the thieves' cant spoken in the latter half of the 19th century and the first half of the 20th century. The actual slang varied greatly from place to place; often Bargoens denotes the variety from the Holland region in the Netherlands. While many words from Bargoens have faded into obscurity, others have become part of standard Dutch (but are more often used in the "Hollandic" than in other Dutch dialects). Hufter (jerk), gappen (to steal) and poen (money) are examples of words now common in Dutch. As is the case for most thieves' languages, many of the words from Bargoens are either insults or concern money, crime or sex.

Bargoens has many Yiddish loanwords. Examples are sjacheren (to barter), mesjogge (crazy), jatten (hands, to steal), gabber (buddy, friend), tof (great), hachelen (to eat).

The name of this cant is close to baragouin, which means "jargon" in French. It is supposed to have been derived either from the Breton words bara+gwin (bread+wine) or from Bourgondisch ('Burgundish', i.e. [the language] from Burgundy).

Many Woonwagenbewoners (Dutch Travellers or Gipsies) used to speak this language as well.

Examples

Also the nicknames of former Dutch guilders were Bargoens:

Further reading

See also 
 Grypsera

Cant languages
Dutch words and phrases
Languages of the Netherlands
Yiddish culture in the Netherlands